Scopula nigrifrons is a moth of the family Geometridae. It is found in India.

References

nigrifrons
Moths of Asia